Line 1 of the Guadalajara light rail system, in service since 1 September 1989, is the oldest line of the Sistema de Tren Eléctrico Urbano (SITEUR). It was previously marked blue, but after the remodelling of the stations from 2014 to 2018 it is now red. 

The road infrastructure of this line was begun in 1974, and was completed in 1976, with the intention of implementing a Metropolitan and Railway Public Transportation System in Guadalajara; same that did not materialize due to the diversion of federal resources which led to the alternative implementation of electric trolleybus lines.

In 1982 an overpass was built at the intersection of Avenida Colón with the Calzada Lázaro Cárdenas and was completed in 1984 (for the extension of the Guadalajara Trolleybus) towards Avenida Miguel López de Legaspi, and its pre-construction began in 1988, extending it from peripheral to peripheral, and it was completed in February 1989, to later be inaugurated in September of that same year. The inauguration was headed by the then Governor of Jalisco, Guillermo Cosío Vidaurri, and by the then President of Mexico, Carlos Salinas de Gortari.

Line 1 links the municipalities of Zapopan, Guadalajara and Tlaquepaque from north to south through the Calzada Federalismo/Avenida Cristóbal Colón.

Line stations 
Line 1 had 19 stations (12 on the surface in 2 sections, 6 underground and one in trench) when it was first opened, but, after the inauguration of Auditorio station, the line now has 20 stations (11 on the surface in 2 sections, 8 underground in 2 sections and one in trench). The stations are described in the following table:

Future extensions and remodelings 
It is intended to extend Line 1 to Arroyo Hondo in the north and to Arroyo Seco in the south. In addition, all surface stations will be remodeled, which will look like the Urdaneta station, which was previously expanded for a failed project to build a light rail line connecting Tlajomulco with Line 1.

Accidents and incidents 
In August 1989, a few days before the presidential inauguration of Line 1, an elderly woman was run over near the Santa Filomena station by a light rail unit that was doing route testing without passengers; After the accident, the driver abandoned the unit to flee on foot.

On January 26, 2015, a collision between two trains was recorded when the driver of the vehicle T-06 was driving without due caution and care, since he had the distance and time to avoid the collision and did not brake in time. It was a mishap between trains caused by a communication error between the drivers and the dispatcher.

In March 2015, another elderly woman was run over next to the Santa Filomena station. Despite the fact that a security film exempted the driver of the unit involved from responsibility, he did not stop driving after the mishap.

On Friday, September 7, 2017, shortly after 11 in the morning, a truck collided with the perimeter fence of the northbound section of the railway between Patria and Isla Raza stations after the driver of the delivery truck lost control claiming brake failure.

On Thursday, September 9, 2021, at the Refugio station around 10:00 in the morning, a blind man fell onto the tracks due to carelessness. The people waiting for the train tried to help him, however, when they rescued his body they realized that the man was already dead.

References 

Line 1 of the Guadalajara light rail system
1989 establishments in Mexico
Transportation in Jalisco
Railway lines opened in 1989
750 V DC railway electrification